Mount Raimer, is a prominent peak in the Taconic Mountains of western Massachusetts and adjacent New York. The west side and summit are located in New York; the east slopes lie within Massachusetts. The summit ridge is part meadow and part wooded with red spruce, balsam fir, and northern hardwood tree species. It is notable for its views of the Hoosic River valley and Hudson River Valley. The  Taconic Crest Trail traverses the mountain. Much of the upper slopes and summit are within protected conservation land. The mountain is the location of a defunct ski area.

Geography
Mount Raimer is located within Williamstown, Massachusetts and the New York towns of Petersburgh and Berlin. The Taconic Mountains continue south from Mount Raimer as Berlin Mountain and north as the White Rock ridgeline. It is flanked to the east by several hills that precede the Hoosic River Valley and the town of Williamstown. The west side of the mountain drains into the Little Hoosic River, thence into the Hoosic River, the Hudson River. The east side drains into the Hoosic River.

Alpine skiing

Mount Raimer was home to lift served alpine skiing for nearly two decades.  Originally known as Petersburg Pass Ski Area, the base lodge and parking lots were located adjacent to the height of land on New York State Route 2.

Started in 1962, the ski area featured a variety of trails served by a Poma double chairlift.  A novice surface lift was added below the base area in 1964.
Due to a variety of reasons, including the steep ascent up Route 2 and the lack of water for snowmaking, the ski area struggled through much of its existence.  As a result, the ski area failed to operate for multiple seasons in the 1970s.  In addition, Petersburg Pass Ski Area was renamed twice in order to try to rebrand its image.  After a short time as Taconic Trails, the ski area was last known as Mount Raimer. An attempt was made to dramatically expand the ski area during its final years, as trails were cut on the western face of the mountain.  This expansion was never completed and the ski area went out of business in 1980. Recently, since about 2010, there has been a renewed interest in the area for backcountry skiing on a couple of the defunct trails and glades.

The double chairlift was later sold to Ski Butternut.

References
 Massachusetts Trail Guide (2004). Boston: Appalachian Mountain Club.

References

External links
 Berkshire Natural Resource Council.
 Rensselaer Land Trust.
 Hopkins Memorial Forest map.
 Hopkins Memorial Forest history
 Taconic Hiking Club
 Williamstown Rural Lands Foundation
 Williamstown Rural Lands Foundation trail map
  Petersburg Pass - New England Lost Ski Areas Project

Mountains of Berkshire County, Massachusetts
Mountains of Rensselaer County, New York
Taconic Mountains
Defunct ski areas and resorts in New York (state)
Mountains of New York (state)